The suffix -land which can be found in several countries' name and country subdivisions indicates a toponymy—a land. The word came via Germanic "land."

Below is the list of places that ends with "-land" or "Lands".

Sovereign states 
Common name:
 
 
 
 
 
 
 
  (Germany)
 
 

Derived name:

Sub-national administrative divisions 
 , Australia
 , Austria
 , Canada
 , Canada
 , Denmark
 , Finland
 Lapland, Finland
 , Germany
 , Germany
 , India
 , the Netherlands
 , the Netherlands
 , the Netherlands
 , the Netherlands
 , Somalia
 , Somalia
 , Somalia
 , United Kingdom
 , United Kingdom
 , United States
Derived name:
 , the Netherlands
 , the Netherlands
 , United Kingdom
 , United States

Other places

Australia 

 Central Highlands Council, Tasmania
 Central Highlands Region, Queensland
 City of Moreland, Victoria
 Shire of East Gippsland, Victoria
 City of Maitland, New South Wales
 City of Nedlands, Western Australia
 Northern Midlands Council, Tasmania
 Town of Port Hedland, Western Australia
 South Gippsland Shire, Victoria
 Southern Midlands Council, Tasmania
 Tablelands Region, Queensland
 Redlands City, Queensland 
 Maitland,  South Australia

Other places
 Arnhem Land, Northern Territory
 Central Highlands, Tasmania
 Central Queensland
 Far North Queensland
 Gippsland, Victoria
 Midlands, Tasmania
 Murraylands, South Australia
 New England, New South Wales
 North Queensland
 Northern Tablelands, New South Wales
 Portland, Victoria
 Riverland, South Australia
 South East Queensland
 Southern Highlands, New South Wales
 Southern Tablelands, New South Wales
 List of islands of Australia

Canada 
Province level
 Newfoundland and Labrador
 Prince Edward Island
County level
 Starland
 Wheatland
 Parkland
 Woodlands
 Cumberland
 Westmorland
 Northumberland County, New Brunswick
 Northumberland County, Ontario
 Welland (historic)

Town level
 Daysland
 Hartland
 Ferryland
 Winterland
 Kirkland
 Midland
 Choiceland
 Luseland
 Zealandia
 Lower Mainland
 Cape Breton Highlands
 Welland
 Clarence-Rockland
 Rossland
 Sunderland
 Aroland
 Summerland
 Peachland
 List of islands of Canada

Denmark 

 Sjælland or Zealand
 Jylland or Jutland
 Sønderjylland
 Midtjylland
 Nordjylland
 Himmerland
 Lolland/Laaland

Finland 

(Names in Swedish/Names in Finnish)
 Nyland / Uusimaa
 Egentliga Finland / Varsinais-Suomi
 Egentliga Tavastland / Kanta-Häme
 Birkaland / Pirkanmaa
 Päijänne-Tavastland / Päijät-Häme
 Mellersta Finland / Keski-Suomi
 Kajanaland / Kainuu
 Lappland / Lappi
 Åland / Ahvenanmaa

Germany 

 A Bundesland
 Rheinland (Rhineland) and Rheinland-Pfalz
 Havelland
 Heligoland
 Jerichower Land
 Mansfelder Land
 Weimarer Land
 Altenburger Land
 Saale-Holzland
 Landsberg
 Saterland
 Sauerland
 Hochsauerlandkreis
 Altes Land
 Vogtland
 Wendland
 Emsland
 Ostfriesland
 Uthlande
 Preetz-Land
 Amt Dobern-Land

The Netherlands 
City level
 Ameland
 Berkelland
 Blokland
 Dinkelland
 Dirksland
 Drechterland
 Gaasterland
 Kollumerland
 Lansingerland
 Lemsterland
 Midden-Delfland
 Montferland
 Nieuw-Lekkerland
 Noord-Beveland
 Noorder-Koggenland
 Opsterland
 Oud-Beijerland
 Reiderland
 Scharsterland
 Schouwen-Duiveland
 Sint Annaland
 Smallingerland
 Steenwijkerland
 Vlieland
 Waterland
 Wester-Koggenland
 Westland
 Wormerland
 Zwartewaterland
 Zuid-Beveland

New Zealand 
 Auckland
 Fiordland
 Northland
 Southland
 Westland

Norway

Sweden

 Skåneland (Previously part of Denmark)

United Kingdom 

Counties
 Northumberland
 Rutland
 West Midlands
 Cumberland (historic)
 Sutherland (historic)
 Westmorland (historic)

Other places:

 Backaland
 Backlands
 Bankland
 Barkisland
 Bennetland
 Berrylands
 Biglands
 Blackland
 Blakelands
 Blisland
 Bowland
 Bordlands
 Boreland
 Boyland
 Brackenlands
 Braehoulland
 Bridgelands
 Broadlands
 Brockhollands
 Brookland
 Brooklands
 Broomlands
 Browland
 Burland
 Burntisland
 Byland
 Collegeland
 East Midlands
 Goathland
 Scottish Highlands
 Shetland
 City of Sunderland
 Sunderland
 Swithland
 West Midlands (region)
 List of islands of the United Kingdom

United States 

Multi-state regions
 New England
Regions entirely in a single state
 the Firelands
 Vacationland
State level
 Maryland
City level
 Ashland
 Cherryland
 Cleveland
 Cloverland
 Cortland
 Courtland
 Dairyland
 Forkland
 Kirtland
 Loveland
 Oakland
 Portland
 Ragland
 Saraland
 Vineland
 Woodland
Village level
 Rhineland
 List of islands of the United States
 Dixieland

Other countries 
 Akhzivland
 Bjarmaland, today comprise a part of Russia
 Boland, Iran
 Boland, Western Cape - South Africa
 Burzenland - Romania
 Courland - Latvia
 Czech lands
 Dubailand - Dubai
 Esanland - Nigeria
 Igboland - Nigeria
 Kvenland, Fennoscandia
 Liberland
 Maryland or Marimland - Russia
 Mashonaland - Zimbabwe
 Samland or Sambia or Kaliningrad Peninsula - Russia 
 Slovene Lands
 Sudetenland - Czech Republic
 Sundaland
 Székely Land or Szeklerland - Romania
 Ussuriland - Russia
 Valland
 Vinland, North America
 Waasland - Belgium
 Woodlands - Singapore
 Yorubaland - Benin, Nigeria, Togo
 Zululand - South Africa
 "Lands" of Antarctica (e.g. Queen Maud Land, Marie Byrd Land) – see Geography of Antarctica for further examples

Former place names
 Ashantiland
  Basutoland
  Bechuanaland Protectorate
 Matabeleland
  Nyasaland Protectorate
 Osterland
 Österland
 Pleissnerland
 Rugiland
  Stellaland
 Swaziland, officially renamed Eswatini
 Togoland
 Wituland

Thematic parks 
 Adventureland
 Coney Island
 Disneyland
 Everland
 Gardaland
 Kings Island
 Legoland
 NeverLand
 Seoul Land
 Wonderland

Fictional places 
From Peter Pan
 Neverland

From Alice in Wonderland
 Wonderland

From Middle-Earth:
 Brown Lands
 Dark Land
 Dunland
 Sun-Lands

From Chronicles of Narnia
 Archenland
 Shallow Lands
 Underland
 Burnt Island
 Dark Island
 Deathwater Island
 Dragon Island
 Lone Islands

Other common names 
 Buckland
 Copeland
 Falkland
 Frankland
 Happyland
 Headland
 Kirkland
 Kirtland
 La La Land
 Lakeland
 Leland
 Maitland
 Midland
 Newland
 Oberland
 Overland
 Parkland
 Redland
 Sealand
 Summerland
 Wayland
 Winterland
 Woodland
 Woodlands

See also 
 List of islands - which technically ends with the "-land" from the word island
 List of fictional islands
 Land as surnames
 -stan
 -desh
 Pradesh
 -tania
 -patnam
 -pur

Suffixes
Place name element etymologies
English suffixes